Rajpur is a village in Narkatiaganj block of West Champaran district in the Indian state of Bihar.

Demographics
As of 2011 India census, Rajpur had a population of 2757 in 522 households. Males constitute 52.7% of the population and females 47.2%. Rajpur has an average literacy rate of 38.7%, lower than the national average of 74%: male literacy is 64.38%, and female literacy is 35.61%. In Rajpur, 21.6% of the population is under 6 years of age.

References

Villages in West Champaran district